is a former professional tennis player from Japan.

She made the round of 16 at the China Open in 2002, as a lucky loser from qualifying. Takase reached a best singles ranking of 250 in the world. 

As a doubles player on the WTA Tour she featured in the main draw of four editions of the Japan Open and was a quarterfinalist at the 2004 Korea Open. Her five ITF doubles titles include a $50k event in Tokyo in 2006.

ITF finals

Singles (1–5)

Doubles (5–23)

References

External links
 
 

1978 births
Living people
Japanese female tennis players
20th-century Japanese women
21st-century Japanese women